

Early history (1898–1930) 
After the Spanish–American War (1898), Filipinos became US nationals, the US Army trained and recruited Filipinos as Volunteer Auxiliary and Contract Nurses to serve in the Philippines focusing on tropical diseases. Several were sent to the US (San Francisco and New York City) for further training and employment. In 1907 formalized nursing education patterned on the US curriculum was established in the Philippines to train Filipino nurses. A shortage of nurses was evident due to the increase in epidemic of tuberculosis, typhoid and other communicable disease and the advent of World War I. The Pensionado Act (1903) established and legislated a formalized framework to send Filipino pensionados (government subsidized scholars) to the United States for further education and training. Some stayed in the US for employment. Since that time a continuous influx of Filipino nurses worked in New York City, and made a contribution to the demands of healthcare at that time. The Philippine Nurses Association – New York was established in 1928 by the Filipino nurses with the goals of promoting cultural understanding and streamline professional guidance to other Filipino nurses. The first president was Marta Ubana, who completed her Bachelor of Science in Teachers College, Columbia University.

See also
Brain drain
Filipino American
Overseas Filipino

References

Alegado, Dean T. (1996) "Carl Damaso: A Champion of Hawaii’s Working People", John Okamura (guest editor), Filipino American History: Identity and Community in Hawaii. Honolulu: Social Process in Hawaii, vol. 37, University of Hawaii at Manoa, pp. 26–35.
Brusch, B., Sockalski, J (2007). "International Nurse Migration: Lesson From Philippines." February edition Pubmed.
Choy, C. (2003)"Empire of Care: Nursing and Migration in Filipino American History" Durnham, NC. Duke University Press.
Compas, L., Santayana, P. (1994). "The Evolution of Philippine Nursing in New York." New York, New York.
Graf, M. (2001). "Women Nurses in Spanish–American War". Minerva Quarterly Report on Women in the Military. Bnet Publishing.
Varona, R. A. (2017, November 2). US nursing shortage may again spur recruitment from PH. Retrieved November 13, 2019, from https://usa.inquirer.net/7777/us-nursing-shortage-may-spur-recruitment-ph.

Further reading

Filipino-American history
Nursing in the United States
History of nursing